The Real Magees was a Canadian talk show television series which aired on CBC Television in 1973.

Premise
This mid-season talk show was hosted by married couple Michael and Duddie Magee. They interviewed an ambulance driver, a taxi driver and other people who were not widely known. The series was co-produced by the CBC and Screen Gems.

Scheduling
The half-hour series aired on weekdays at 1:30 p.m. from 22 May to 14 September 1973.

References

External links
 
 

CBC Television original programming
1973 Canadian television series debuts
1973 Canadian television series endings
1970s Canadian television talk shows
Television series by Screen Gems